The RUR-5 ASROC (for "Anti-Submarine Rocket") is an all-weather, all sea-conditions anti-submarine missile system. Developed by the United States Navy in the 1950s, it was deployed in the 1960s, updated in the 1990s, and eventually installed on over 200 USN surface ships, specifically cruisers, destroyers, and frigates. The ASROC has been deployed on scores of warships of many other navies, including Canada, Germany, Italy, Japan, the Republic of China, Greece, Pakistan and others.

History
ASROC started development as the Rocket Assisted Torpedo (RAT) program by the Naval Ordnance Test Station at China Lake in the early 1950s to develop a surface warship ASW weapon to counter the new post-World War II submarines which ran quieter, at much higher speed and could attack from much longer range with high speed homing torpedoes. In addition, the goal was to take advantage of modern sonars with a much larger detection range. An extended range torpedo delivered by parachute from the air would allow warships the stand-off capability to attack hostile submarines with very little advance notice to the hostile submarine.

The RAT program came in three phases:  RAT-A, RAT-B and RAT-C. RAT-A and its follow-on, RAT-B, were compact and economical stand-off weapons for smaller warships, but were determined to be either unreliable or had too short a range. RAT-C was developed as a stand-off ASW weapon that used a nuclear depth charge. This required a range of at least  to escape potential damage from the underwater blast.  The RAT-C was considerably larger than the previous RAT program rockets to accommodate the extended range needed and was for larger warships.

After the failure of both the RAT-A and RAT-B programs, RAT-C was redesigned to use not only a nuclear depth charge but also a homing ASW torpedo. To obtain the accuracy needed, the RAT-C rocket launcher had to be redesigned with larger side fins. This program finally combined reliability and accuracy, along with the required stand-off range. Before RAT-C reached operational status in 1960, aboard the large US Navy destroyer leader , its name was changed to ASROC. ASROC was deployed in 1961 and eventually made the majority of USN surface combatants nuclear-capable.

Description
The first ASROC system using the MK-112 "Matchbox" launcher was developed in the 1950s and installed in the 1960s. This system was phased out in the 1990s and replaced with the RUM-139 Vertical Launch ASROC, or "VLA".

After a surface ship, patrol plane or anti-submarine helicopter detects an enemy submarine by using sonar or other sensors, it could relay the sub's position to an ASROC-equipped ship for attack. The attacking ship would then fire an ASROC missile carrying an acoustic homing torpedo or a W44 Nuclear Depth Bomb onto an unguided ballistic trajectory toward the target. At a pre-determined point on the missile's trajectory, the payload separates from the missile and deploys a parachute to permit splashdown and water entry at a low speed and with minimum detectable noise. Water entry activates the torpedo, which is guided by its own sonar system, and homes in on the target using either active sonar or passive sonar.

W44 nuclear depth charge
The W44 nuclear depth charge entered service in 1961, but was never used beyond one or two tests before the Limited Nuclear Test Ban Treaty banning underwater nuclear tests went into effect. A total of 575 weapons were produced. Following payload separation, the unguided W44 sank quickly to a predetermined depth where the 10-kiloton warhead detonated. The nuclear-armed ASROC was never used in combat. W44-armed ASROC missiles were retired by 1989, when all types of nuclear depth bombs were removed from deployment.

Specific installations

The first large group of ships to receive ASROC were 78 s, modified under the Fleet Rehabilitation and Modernization Mark I program (FRAM I) in the early 1960s. A Mark 112 8-tube ASROC launcher was added along with other major modifications. ASROC reloads were stowed alongside the helicopter hangar and handled by a small crane.

The 31 U.S. Navy s were all built with the Mark 16 Mod 7 ASROC Launching Group and MK 4 ASROC Weapons Handling System (AWHS) reload system. These had one standard Mark 112 octuple ASROC launcher, located immediately above a reload system holding an additional 16 assembled rounds (two complete reloads of eight missiles apiece). Thus, each Spruance-class destroyer originally carried a maximum total of 24 ASROC.

Most other US Navy and allied navy destroyers, destroyer escorts, frigates, and several different classes of cruisers only carried the one ASROC "matchbox" MK 112 launcher with eight ASROC missiles (although later in service, some of those missiles could be replaced by the Harpoon anti-ship missile). The "matchbox" Mk 112 launchers were capable of carrying a mixture of the two types. Reloads were carried in many classes, either on first level of the superstructure immediately abaft the launcher, or in a separate deckhouse just forward or abaft the Mk 112.

The MK 16 Launching Group also had configurations that supported RGM-84 Harpoon (onboard  destroyer escorts (frigates)) or a variation of the Tartar missile in limited distribution.

Ships with the Mk 26 GMLS, and late marks of the Mk 10 GMLS aboard the s, could accommodate ASROC in these power-loaded launchers (the Mk 13 GMLS was not able to fire the weapon, as the launcher rail was too short).

Most Spruance-class destroyers were later modified to include the Mk 41 VLS, these launchers are capable of carrying a mixture of the RUM-139 VL-ASROC, the Tomahawk TLAM, and other missiles. All of the Spruance destroyers carried two separate quad Harpoon launchers. Other US ships with the Mk 41 can also accommodate VL-ASROC.

Operators

Former operators

 - only on s (after IRE/DELEX modification.)

 - only on s

 - only on  using a Mk 10 GMLS launcher (depot for 40 missiles, between RIM-2 Terrier / RIM-67A SM-1ER and ASROC)

 and 
 - same configurations as US Navy were also deployed on some United States Coast Guard 378' (115 m) High Endurance Hamilton-class cutters during the 1970s and early 1980s.

See also
 Ikara
 Hong Sang Eo
 Malafon
 MILAS
 RUM-139 VL-ASROC
 Sea Lance
 SUBROC
 Terasca
 List of nuclear weapons
 Nuclear weapon design
 SUW-N-1

References

External links

 https://fas.org/man/dod-101/sys/missile/vla.htm
 http://www.gyrodynehelicopters.com/asroc.htm
 http://designation-systems.net/dusrm/r-5.html
 DiGiulian, Tony Navweaps.com ASROC page
 Allbombs.html list of all US nuclear warheads at nuclearweaponarchive.org

Anti-submarine missiles of the United States
Cold War nuclear missiles of the United States
Ballistic missiles of the United States
Cold War anti-submarine weapons of the United States
Mk016
RUR005
Honeywell
Military equipment introduced in the 1960s